Island Trees Union Free School District is a school district in central Nassau County on Long Island, approximately 31 miles east of New York City. The district includes parts of the following hamlets; Levittown, Bethpage, Plainedge, and Seaford.

The Island Trees School District gained notoriety in the United States Supreme Court case Island Trees School District v. Pico regarding censorship of books in school libraries.

History
The School District dates back to 1902. In 1982, the district went to the US Supreme Court to defend banning books in Island Trees School District v. Pico.

Schools

Elementary schools (K-4) 
 J. Fred Sparke Elementary
 Michael F. Stokes Elementary

Middle schools (5-8) 
 Island Trees Memorial Middle School

High school (9-12) 
 Island Trees High School

Other
 Early Childhood Center at the Geneva Gallow School, Bethpage
 Island Trees Public Library, Bethpage

Notable alumni
Kevin Covais, former American Idol contestant and actor.
Tom Kapinos, American television executive producer and screenwriter best known for his creation of the television series Californication.
Donnie J. Klang of Making The Band 4.
Edward Joseph Mahoney (1949 – 2019), known professionally as Eddie Money, American rock singer and songwriter
Steven Pico, student who first brought on the case on banning books to the Supreme Court in Island Trees School District v. Pico.

References

External links
 

Education in Nassau County, New York
School districts in New York (state)
School districts established in 1902